Eric "Ricky" Tomlinson (born 26 September 1939) is an English actor. He is best known for his television roles as Bobby Grant in Brookside, DCI Charlie Wise in Cracker and Jim Royle in The Royle Family (1998–2012) and playing the titular character in the film Mike Bassett: England Manager (2001).

Early life
Eric Tomlinson was born on 26 September 1939 at Burleigh House in Bispham, Blackpool, Lancashire, and has lived in Liverpool nearly all his life. His father was a baker and he was born in Bispham, near Blackpool, because, just after the outbreak of World War II, his mother Peggy was evacuated there over concerns that Liverpool would be bombed. He attended Walton Technical College in Walton, after passing an exam when he was 13. His favourite subject was English.

In the late 1950s and early 1960s, Tomlinson played banjo in bands known as the Guitanjos, Hobo Rick & The City Slickers, and Hobo Rick and the Hi-Free Three. For a time, the band's pianist was John "Duff" Lowe, a former member of Beatles forerunner the Quarrymen.

Career

Plasterer
A plasterer by trade, he worked on various building sites for many years.

Television
As an actor he appeared as Bobby Grant in the soap opera Brookside from the show's inception in 1982 until being written out in 1988, followed by DCI Charlie Wise in Cracker and as Jim Royle in the sitcom The Royle Family.

In 2002 Tomlinson starred in the BBC Series Nice Guy Eddie playing a Liverpool private investigator. Using down-to-earth cases — actually based upon real-life ones from Liverpool private investigator Tony Smith — the show also starred Tom Ellis and John Henshaw.

Tomlinson featured heavily in series two of Paul Abbott's series Clocking Off, in a BAFTA-nominated episode written by Danny Brocklehurst.

Tomlinson has fronted a series of television adverts for the utility company British Gas. In January 2010, he began to appear in a series of advertisements for the frozen food chain Farmfoods. In 2017, he provided a voiceover for an advert for McCain Foods.

On 19 June 2006, Tomlinson made his début as the guest celebrity in Dictionary Corner on the long-running UK Channel 4 game show Countdown.

In December 2006, he presented a programme in Channel Five's Disappearing Britain series entitled "When Coal Was King".

In March 2007, Tomlinson presented BBC's One Life: Guilty My Arse, detailing his version of the "Shrewsbury Two" case, in which he compared his political activism as a trade unionist to the work of the suffragettes.

The BBC broadcast a programme in its Who Do You Think You Are? series 13 on Tomlinson's ancestors, which traced his family back through a number of carters working around Liverpool at a time when the city was a bustling port.

In 2020, Tomlinson, alongside his Royle Family co-star Ralf Little, presented a travel series called Ricky & Ralf's Very Northern Road Trip for Gold.

Film
Tomlinson has also starred in several films, notably Mike Bassett: England Manager, Raining Stones and Hillsborough, a made-for-TV film about the families of the victims of the Hillsborough disaster, in which he portrayed John Glover – the father of victim Ian Glover.

In 2017, Tomlinson starred in the LGBT short film Tellin' Dad (2017) (co-starring actor Carl Loughlin as his son) which was the first LGBT project he has been involved in and followed the journey of his son building up courage to come out to him. The film was released on DVD, Amazonplay and distributed by Peccadillo Pictures worldwide on several platforms and on their Boys on Film DVD collection.

Music
Tomlinson is also a keen banjo and harmonica player, and has played the instruments in many episodes of The Royle Family. In 2001 he teamed up with fellow Brookside actor Michael Starke and other friends for his own rendition of well-known folk songs including "It's a Long Way To Tipperary" and a cover of Shane MacGowan and The Popes' "Are You Lookin' at Me?" that reached No. 28 in the UK Singles Chart in 2001. A CD album entitled Music My Arse was released the same year, peaking at No. 127 in the UK Albums Chart. He released a single at Christmas 2006 entitled "Christmas My Arse" which reached No. 25.

Theatre
In 2006, Tomlinson toured to theatres across the UK with his show An Evening with Ricky Tomlinson where he was interviewed about his life by Elton Welsby.

During 2008 and 2009, Tomlinson took his Laughter Show theatrical revue on a UK tour with fellow comedians Tony Barton, Duncan Norvelle and Pauline Daniels.

In 2009, he took a lead role as the Head Judge in the "VMH Club Star Talent Trail", a local talent-based competition held at the VMH Club in Garston. A large number of North West-based performers entered the competition, which was ultimately won by 14-year-old Shaun Walsh from Liverpool.

In May 2010, Tomlinson opened his own cabaret club the Green Room, in Liverpool, teaming up with brothers Richard and Simon Wallace, from Liverpool production company Red Hot Media, to open the 250-seater cabaret lounge on Duke Street. In March 2011 Tomlinson appeared in an advertising campaign for UK retail chain The Range.

Personal life
He had three children with his first wife.

In 2003, he published an autobiography, entitled Ricky, which spent five weeks at the top of the UK best-selling new books chart. In the book, Tomlinson admitted to having affairs as well as describing in detail his time in prison.

On 19 October 2007, Tomlinson had quadruple heart bypass surgery at Liverpool's Cardiothoracic Centre. Consultant cardiac surgeon Aung Oo said: "The operation went according to plan and he is now recovering within the hospital's critical care unit."

Tomlinson suffers from nodular prurigo, which was the subject of an interview in the Daily Mirror in October 2013.

Tomlinson still resides in Liverpool, stating "I will never, ever move away from Liverpool, I love it here."

Politics
In his late 20s, Tomlinson was attracted to right-wing politics and, by his own account, was a member of the National Front for a period after Enoch Powell's April 1968 "Rivers of Blood" speech. In the early 1970s, Tomlinson's political views shifted to the left. He was affected by the book The Ragged-Trousered Philanthropists, which was given to him by the governor of the prison in which he was being held.

In 1972, he joined the flying pickets in a building workers' dispute in Shrewsbury. Following allegations of violence during this protest, in 1973 Tomlinson was charged with "conspiracy to intimidate" as one of the Shrewsbury Two. Despite pleading his innocence at Shrewsbury Crown Court, he was found guilty and sentenced to two years in prison, alongside fellow picket Des Warren. After his release in 1975, he disrupted the TUC conference by shouting from the wings after he had been prevented from speaking on the stage. In 2012, Tomlinson and others sought to have the convictions overturned by the Criminal Cases Review Commission (CCRC). In 2013 a paper petition was launched, alongside the existing e-petition, for an Early Day Motion by MP John McDonnell to be brought. In July 2013, at the Durham Miners' Gala, he again campaigned against the convictions. In May 2020 it was announced that the CCRC had referred a number of convictions relating to the Shrewsbury dispute, including Tomlinson's, to the Court of Appeal which subsequently overturned the convictions in March 2021.

Tomlinson is a close friend of Arthur Scargill and often appears on party political broadcasts for Scargill's Socialist Labour Party, most recently for the 2009 European Parliament elections. He is a long-time member of the Socialist Labour Party, and is the party's most prominent celebrity supporter since its formation in 1996.

He has also expressed support for the Campaign for a New Workers' Party. A public meeting was hosted by the CNWP in Liverpool on Monday 12 February 2007, which Tomlinson addressed alongside Tommy Sheridan and Tony Mulhearn in which he used the slogan: "New Labour My Arse".

On 5 February 2010, Tomlinson revealed his plan to stand as the Socialist Labour Party candidate for the Liverpool Wavertree constituency at the 2010 general election in protest at the selection of Luciana Berger, a 28-year-old Londoner as the Labour Party candidate. Kim Singleton was ultimately selected for the seat; in a statement, the SLP said that he could not contest the election due to "personal and contractual commitments". Tomlinson added: "I am disappointed not to be able to stand. But I am pleased to give the chosen candidate my wholehearted support." He also commented, "People say you could be letting the Tories in. But there is no difference between the Conservatives and New Labour". Singleton ultimately finished sixth out of seven candidates, with Berger winning the seat.

In a guest appearance on an episode of the ITV lunchtime chat show, Loose Women, broadcast on 17 August 2015, while discussing the forthcoming Labour Party leadership election, Tomlinson said:
I know both of them and I know Andy quite well, and he was my choice right up until I went to listen to Jeremy Corbyn and I went to the Adelphi Hotel where there was 3,000 people there, the room holds 800 and were out into the streets, they couldn't get in. And everything he said with I agreed with you know, leave the National Health Service alone, get rid of Trident, stuff like that, so it doesn't matter to me who gets the Labour leadership, it really doesn't matter. But whatever happens both of them will be in the Shadow Cabinet.

Richard Whiteley claims
In March 2017, Tomlinson claimed during an interview that the late journalist, broadcaster and game show host Richard Whiteley had been an undercover agent for the British security services and had assisted them in securing his 1973 imprisonment by co-presenting a television documentary called Red Under the Bed, which was critical of his political and trade union activities and had swayed the jury. The CCRC cited the documentary and its possible influence on the jury when announcing its decision to refer the cases of Tomlinson and others to the Court of Appeal.

Charity work
In 2008, Tomlinson donated £200,000 as patron of the Human Milk Bank of Cheshire and North Wales. The charity provides babies on Special Care Baby Units with milk from donor mothers, significantly improving their chances of survival and long-term development. He said: "Due to my own recent experiences with my health, I know how much hospitals and appeals appreciate help and assistance. This is such an important service which can help so many families and I'm very honoured to be the patron."

In November 2010, it was reported that Tomlinson had donated £1 million to the Alder Hey Children's Hospital in Liverpool two years previously.

Honours
In October 2014, Tomlinson was awarded the Freedom of Liverpool.

Filmography

 Boys from the Blackstuff (1981)
 Brookside (TV series) (1982–1988)
 Riff-Raff (1991)
 Raining Stones (1993)
 Roughnecks (TV series) (1994–1995)
 Cracker (TV series) (1994–1996)
 Butterfly Kiss (1995)
 Bob's Weekend (1996)
 Hillsborough (1996)
 Das Leben ist eine Baustelle (1997)
 The Fix (1997)
 Preaching to the Perverted (1997)
 Mojo (1997)
 Playing the Field (TV series) (1998–2002)
 The Royle Family (TV series) (1998–2012)
 Dockers (TV drama) (1999)
 The Greatest Store in the World (1999)
 Hooves of Fire - Santa Claus (1999)
 Nasty Neighbours (2000)
 Down to Earth (2000)
 Mike Bassett: England Manager (2001)
 The 51st State (2001)
 Derek (feature film) (2001)
 Nice Guy Eddie (2001–2002)
 Once Upon a Time in the Midlands (2002)
 Al's Lads (2002)
 The Virgin of Liverpool (2003)
 Dalziel and Pascoe episode: "The Price of Fame" (2004) as Rowan Priestley
 Mike Bassett: Manager (TV series) (2005)
 Stepdad (2007)
 Football My Arse (DVD 2007)
 Laughter Show - Live (DVD 2008)
 Nativity! (2009)
 Flutter (2010)
 Great Night Out (2013) as Warren
 In the Flesh (2013–2014)
 Northern Soul (2014)
 Grimsby (2016)
 Tellin' Dad (2017)
 Gloves Off 
 The More You Ignore Me (2018)
 Ricky & Ralf's Very Northern Road Trip (2020)
 The Witchfinder (2022)

References

External links

BBC profile, retrieved 14 December 2007
"Ricky Tomlinson: Royle Rebel", BBC, 28 September 2001

Detailed account of Ricky Tomlins 
Ricky Tomlinson's speech from the dock after being convicted for conspiracy to intimidate in the 1972 Builder's Strike 
The Green Room cabaret club in Liverpool

1939 births
Living people
20th-century English male actors
21st-century English male actors
British male comedy actors
British political activists
English autobiographers
English comedy writers
English male film actors
English male soap opera actors
English male television actors
English prisoners and detainees
English socialists
English trade unionists
Male actors from Lancashire
Male actors from Liverpool
Musicians from Liverpool
Overturned convictions in England
People from Bispham, Blackpool
Prisoners and detainees of England and Wales
Socialist Labour Party (UK) members